Information Commission is a government agency responsible for ensuring citizens have access to information according to the Right to Information Act, 2009. Martuza Ahmed, former secretary at the Ministry of Information, is the incumbent chief information commissioner.

History
The Information Commission was established on 1 July 2009 by the Bangladesh Awami League government. It was based on the Right to Information Ordinance which was passed in 2008 by the Caretaker Government during the 2006–2008 Bangladeshi political crisis and ratified by the parliament on 29 March 2009. The first chief information commissioner was M Azizur Rahman a retired government secretary. Sadeka Halim, a professor at University of Dhaka, and Mohammad Abu Taher, another retired secretary, were the first two commissioners. They were selected through a selection committee led by a judge of the Bangladesh Supreme Court. Security and intelligence agencies are exempted from provisions of the commission. Decisions of the commission regarding request for information can be appealed in courts. The commission provided information for 95 percent of the requests it received. It also fines designation officers for not providing the requested information.

List of Chief Information Commissioners

References

Government agencies of Bangladesh
2009 establishments in Bangladesh
Organisations based in Dhaka